The Backer Islands are a chain of small islands at the south side of Cranton Bay. They were mapped by the United States Geological Survey from surveys and from U.S. Navy air photos, 1960–66, and named by the Advisory Committee on Antarctic Names for Walter K. Backer, a U.S. Navy chief construction mechanic at Byrd Station, 1967.

See also 
 List of Antarctic and subantarctic islands

References 

Islands of Ellsworth Land